Dangku is a village in the Sunpura sub-district of Lohit district in Arunachal Pradesh, India. According to the 2011 Census of India it had 213 residents in 39 households. 110 were male and 103 were female.

References 

Villages in Lohit district